Porumbeni or Porumbenii may refer to:

 Porumbeni, Harghita, a commune in Harghita County, Romania, sometimes called Porumbenii
 Porumbenii, a village in Silivașu de Câmpie Commune, Bistriţa-Năsăud County, Romania
 Porumbeni, a village in Ceuașu de Câmpie Commune, Mureș County, Romania
 Porumbeni, a village in Paşcani Commune, Criuleni district, Moldova

See also 
 Porumbești (disambiguation)
 Porumbrei, a commune in Cimişlia district, Moldova